Stop-Loss is a 2008 American war drama film directed by Kimberly Peirce and starring Ryan Phillippe, Channing Tatum, Abbie Cornish and Joseph Gordon-Levitt as young soldiers whose experience in the Iraq War leaves them psychologically shattered. It was distributed by Paramount Pictures and produced by MTV Films. The film received mixed reviews, and earned less than half of its $25 million production budget at the box office. The title refers to the U.S. government's controversial stop-loss policy, which allows the government to extend the term of duty of soldiers who have already served their contracted number of years of service.

Plot
U.S. Army Staff Sergeant Brandon King leads a squad stationed in Tikrit during the Iraq War. The film begins with footage from the tour of the squad, explaining they have 28 days before returning to the United States. While on duty at a checkpoint, the squad hears gunshots, after which a car speeds past filled with insurgents, one of whom fires an AK-47 at them. King's men jump into their Humvees and follow the insurgents into an alley. When the soldiers get out of their vehicles, the insurgents ambush them from rooftops.

As the firefight ensues, a rocket propelled grenade (RPG) is discharged, destroying one of the Humvees, killing two soldiers inside. Shortly after, another RPG is discharged, exploding an Iraqi vehicle. Squad member PFC Tommy Burgess is unfortunately near the vehicle when the RPG is discharged but another soldier, Pvt. Rico Rodriguez, dives on Burgess and saves him. This is at the expense of severely wounding Pvt. Rodriguez. Shortly after, fellow squad member Paul "Preacher" Colston, a close friend of Tommy, is shot in the neck and jaw in front of Tommy, and is killed instantly.

Later, when Staff Sergeant King enters a house to help injured long-time friend and squad member Sgt. Steve Shriver, he discovers that he had accidentally killed several Iraqi civilians by throwing a grenade to kill an insurgent in a room, unaware of any civilians present in the area. Brandon is visibly shocked and the ambush ends with three soldiers killed.

Upon returning to their Texas hometown of Brazos, Brandon and Steve are decorated with the Bronze Star and Purple Heart in a solemn ceremony. A U.S. Senator takes Brandon aside after the ceremony and offers to help Brandon in any way he can. That night, Steve shows the effects of post-traumatic stress disorder. He gets drunk and digs a foxhole in his front yard, and strikes his fiancée Michelle in the face. When Brandon comes over to check on Steve, he is unable to get through to him. Tommy drives over drunk after his wife has kicked him out.

The next day, Brandon suggests that they all go to the "ranch", a small forest cabin located outside of town. The men pass the time by drinking and watching Tommy shoot his wedding gifts, after their friend Shorty reads the cards. Upon hearing the commotion, a hungover Steve awakens and shoots the cards to silence them and to show his skills in sniping. The next day, Brandon, Tommy and Steve report to their military base. When Brandon arrives expecting to be discharged, he is unexpectedly ordered back to active duty in Iraq, based on the military's controversial stop-loss policy, which required soldiers who had fulfilled their required tours of duty to return to the war. He refuses to comply and goes AWOL, becoming a deserter.

Michelle sympathizes with Brandon's refusal and offers to travel with him to Washington, D.C. to see the Senator who offered to assist Brandon earlier. During a multi-day drive to Washington, D.C., Brandon calls the Senator's office and is told that because he is now a fugitive, the Senator is not interested in seeing him. Brandon and Michelle also visit the family of Paul "Preacher" Colson, one of the three soldiers under Brandon's command killed in the alley ambush and encounter another AWOL soldier who recommends a lawyer to help arrange forged discharge documents so he could establish a new identity in Canada.

They also visit Rico Rodriguez, a soldier who was blinded, lost his right arm and leg, and sustained facial burns from saving Tommy from a rocket-propelled grenade, previously during the ambush in Iraq. After Michelle phones Steve to tell him of their exact location, he arrives in uniform to take Brandon back, and tells Michelle he has volunteered to return to Iraq. Brandon refuses to return and Michelle is furious with Steve for re-enlisting and ends their relationship. Brandon and Michelle finally reach New York City and meet with the lawyer, who gives Brandon forged papers and a passport which would allow him to flee to Canada in exchange for payment of $1,000. Tommy, who is depressed after being discharged from the army, commits suicide, Brandon returns to visit Tommy's grave immediately after the funeral, only to end up in a dispute with Steve, ultimately turning into a physical battle ending with Brandon leaving the cemetery and Steve weeping.

Brandon, his mother and Michelle drive to the Mexican border, but Brandon ultimately decides that he does not want to abandon everything that he has ever known. He also tells his mother and Michelle that if he goes to Mexico he'll never really be able to leave the war behind him. The final scene depicts a busload of soldiers, including Brandon and Steve, returning to the war.

Cast

Production
Principal photography began in August 2006 in Morocco and various locations in Texas – Austin, Lockhart, San Antonio and Uhland. However, the film was not released until March 28, 2008.

Home media
The DVD was released on July 8, 2008. The DVD includes an audio commentary by director Kimberly Peirce and co-writer Mark Richard, 2 featurettes, and 11 deleted scenes.

Reception

Critical response
Rotten Tomatoes reports a 64% approval rating, based on 143 reviews, with an average rating of 6.27/10 and the consensus: "Stop-Loss is sincere and complex, and features strong performances, even if it tries to cover too much ground." Metacritic reported the film had an average score of 61 out of 100, based on 35 reviews.

James Berardinelli described the film as one in a line of "preachy movies about the war in Iraq" and described it as "simplistic and uninteresting", citing it as no more effective than films by others (including Robert Redford, Brian De Palma, Gavin Hood, and Paul Haggis) who preceded Kimberly Peirce in attempting to tell a story with the "basic premise" that "War is hell, the U.S. government is deceitful, and soldiers are being irrevocably damaged." Peter Travers noted in his review of the film that several Iraq War movies had failed the year before ("Box-office casualties last year include Lions for Lambs, Rendition, Redacted, Grace Is Gone, and In the Valley of Elah"), and felt that Stop Loss "touches greatness" despite what he called "a curse hanging over it" and "has the juice to break the jinx."

Box office
Despite favorable reviews, the film was a box office bomb. In its opening weekend, it grossed a mere $4.5 million in 1,291 theaters in the United States and Canada, ranking #8 at the box office. As of June 17, 2008, it has grossed a total of $10.9 million in the U.S. and Canada and over $16,000 in other territories. The film had an estimated budget of $25 million and only grossed $11 million worldwide, less than half of its budget.

References

External links
 
 
 
 
 
 
 Stop-Loss Production Notes
 Kimberly Peirce's interview with The Young Turks.

2008 films
2000s war drama films
American war drama films
2000s English-language films
2000s Spanish-language films
Films set in the United States
Films shot in Texas
Films shot in San Antonio
Films shot in Morocco
Iraq War films
MTV Films films
Paramount Pictures films
Films produced by Scott Rudin
Films directed by Kimberly Peirce
Films scored by John Powell
Films about the United States Army
Films about veterans
2008 drama films
Films about deserters
Films about post-traumatic stress disorder
2000s American films